James Alexander Goodson (March 21, 1921 – May 1, 2014) was a United States Army Air Force fighter ace who was credited with shooting down fifteen aircraft and destroying another fifteen on the ground during World War II.

Military career

Goodson trained initially with the Royal Canadian Air Force (RCAF), at Buffalo, leaving 5 March 1941 as flight sergeant. He joined the Royal Air Force (RAF) in No. 43 Squadron RAF, followed by No. 416 Squadron RAF, then the American Squadron in the RAF, the Eagle Squadron, founded by Charles Sweeny (whose autobiography he later helped write and publish). He joined the United States Army Air Forces (USAAF) on 24 September 1942 as a second lieutenant, before becoming commanding officer of 336th Fighter Squadron of the 4th Fighter Group and deputy commanding officer of the group. He trained with the RCAF on the Harvard II AT-6, with the RAF he first flew Hurricanes then Spitfires and with USAAF a P-47 Thunderbolt and then a P-51 Mustang VF-B. He was missing in action on 20 June 1944, having been shot down by antiaircraft fire  while strafing Neu Brandenburg airdrome. He was injured and escaped capture for a few days before being caught and handed over to the Gestapo. He talked his way out of summary execution by teaching his interrogator to blow smoke rings and ended up POW in Stalag Luft III until liberation. His nickname was 'King of the Strafers' for his extreme low flying.

He received more than 22 awards from 5 countries, including the British Distinguished Flying Cross, the American Distinguished Flying Cross 9 times, the Air Medal 21 times, the Purple Heart, the Belgian Order of Leopold with Silver palm Leaf and the French Legion of Honour in the grade of Chevalier (Knight).

Post-war
After the war he settled near his friend Bob Stanford-Tuck in Sandwich, Kent. He had a business career with Goodyear, Hoover and ITT before retiring to write his first memoir, Tumult in the Clouds.

He became an excellent after dinner speaker, a bon vivant, monocle in eye, including Bomber Command dinners, and wrote more books, The Last of the Knights and Overpaid, Oversexed and Over Here (with Norman Franks). He helped set up a publishing company to publish the memoirs of friends and fellow pilots, such as Percy "Laddie" Lucas. This group, with add-ons such as Johnnie Johnson, also went to air shows to "meet the punters". He moved back to Massachusetts in 1993.

He was aboard the SS Athenia when she was torpedoed by U-30 on 3 September 1939.

References

External links

1921 births
2014 deaths
American World War II flying aces
Chevaliers of the Légion d'honneur
Recipients of the Air Medal
Recipients of the Croix de Guerre 1939–1945 (France)
Recipients of the Croix de guerre (Belgium)
Recipients of the Distinguished Flying Cross (United Kingdom)
Recipients of the Distinguished Flying Cross (United States)
Recipients of the Distinguished Service Cross (United States)
Recipients of the Order of the Crown (Belgium)
Recipients of the Silver Star
Royal Air Force officers
Royal Air Force personnel of World War II
Royal Canadian Air Force personnel of World War II
United States Army Air Forces pilots of World War II
Burials at Massachusetts National Cemetery